Kalavi (also Romanized as Kalāvī; also known as Golābī and Kalābī) is a village in Bemani Rural District, Byaban District, Minab County, Hormozgan Province, Iran. At the 2006 census, its population was 409, in 69 families.

References 

Populated places in Minab County